The Sydney Japanese International School (abbreviated as SJIS), formerly known in English as the Sydney Japanese School, is an independent co-educational Nihonjin gakkō (Japanese international) primary and secondary day school, located in  within the Northern Beaches Council area of Sydney, Australia.

The school serves elementary and junior high school levels, from Year K to Year 9. The school accepts non-Japanese students, offering them international classes. SJIS is the only Japanese international school in the world to have an English-language division.

The international classes follow the New South Wales curriculum, while there is also a Japanese division following the Japanese curriculum. Tetsuo Mizukami (水上 徹男 Mizukami Tetsuo), author of The Sojourner Community: Japanese Migration and Residency in Australia, wrote in 2007 that the international classes are "so popular" that Australian parents have requested that the SJIS introduce them at the high school level.

History

SJIS, the first overseas Japanese school not in an undeveloped country, opened in May 1969 in one room in a Lindfield church. The school was established due to an increase in the Japanese population in the Sydney area, and it served elementary and junior high school levels using a Japanese curriculum. SJIS moved to its permanent location in 1971. It began having the Australian curriculum division for kindergarten through grade 6 in 1975. The school acquired an additional  of land in October 1984. It established a kindergarten in January 1997.

Admissions
 the Japanese division accepts Japanese passport holders who have long-term visas in Australia. Students with other citizenships may be accepted into Japanese division depending on the school's decision. The international division accepts students with any citizenship so long as they at least have the right to live in Australia long-term and if their parents reside with them. The deputy principal conducts a language examination.

Curriculum and instruction

Each division of SJIS focuses on one stream of education. The international division delivers the New South Wales Curriculum from Kindergarten through to Grade 6. The Japanese Division delivers the Japanese Curriculum from Grade 1 to Year 9. Japanese division students, as of 2014, do five hours of English each week. International division students, as of 2014, do five hours of Japanese instruction each week.

The students in both divisions combine classrooms in three of their subjects: Music, Physical Education and Visual Arts.

Bilingual assemblies are held weekly and all students study and play on the one campus allowing for friendships and interaction throughout the day. By mainstreaming the two divisions the students feel very much part of one school.

Bilingual Education

At SJIS significant advances in second language teaching and learning are made through an affiliation with the Centre for Language Teaching Research at Macquarie University (Sydney).  Curriculum development is monitored by some of Australia's top researcher's in second language acquisition.

All SJIS students from Kindergarten to year 6 have 45-minute language lessons; high school language lessons, 50 minutes per class, are for either Japanese or English.

As of 2005 the school usually placed two or three non-Japanese students in each class.

Campus
A two-storey classroom and office building was built in February 1996. It includes a soccer oval, and a  running track. the school installed the track in 1993.

Classrooms include smartboards and telephones connected to the school's Information and Communication Technology (ICT) system. The campus has computer rooms, science laboratories, and special subject rooms such as those for music and home.

Operations
Students are required to wear school uniforms. As of 2014 the annual tuition is 9,000 per child.

Student body
As of 2014 the international division has 87 students while the Japanese division has 79 students. As of January 2018 the total number of students at SJIS is 226.

See also

 Japanese Australian
 List of non-government schools in New South Wales
Part-time Japanese schools in Australia
 Canberra Japanese Supplementary School
 Melbourne International School of Japanese
 Japanese Language Supplementary School of Queensland

References

Further reading

 原 博男. "オ-ストラリアの"小さな日本"—シドニ-日本人学校 (トライ・アブロ-ド--学校から世界へ<特集>)." 教育評論 (493), p26-29, 1988–07. アドバンテ-ジサ-バ-. See profile at CiNii.
 秋山 和規. "キャンベラの教育事情とシドニ-日本人学校 (オ-ストラリアの教育--クィ-ンズランド州・南オ-ストラリア州)." Journal of Overseas Education (海外の教育) 23(5), 20–21, 1997–05. 全国海外教育事情研究会. See profile at CiNii.
 山本 哲生. "シドニ-日本人学校の教育と課題 (世界教育連盟オ-ストラリア大会に参加して)." Bulletin of the Culture Research Institute, Educational System Research Institute (日本大学精神文化研究所・教育制度研究所紀要) (8), p231-254, 1977–03. 日本大学精神文化研究所〔ほか〕. See profile at CiNii.
 江沢 誠一. "開かれた日本人学校の息吹--シドニ-日本人学校 (海外子女教育<特集>)." The Monthly Journal of Mombusho (文部時報) (1196), p68-73, 1977–01. ぎょうせい. See profile at CiNii.

External links
 Sydney Japanese International School English Version
 Sydney Japanese International School Japanese Version
 

Asian-Australian culture in Sydney
International schools in Sydney
Private primary schools in Sydney
Private secondary schools in New South Wales
Sydney
Japanese international schools in Australia
Educational institutions established in 1969
1969 establishments in Australia
Private schools Northern Beaches Sydney